Marian Rivera Gracia-Dantes (born 12 August 1984) is a Spanish-Filipina actress, commercial model and entrepreneur. She gained prominence as a widely-acclaimed actress for her roles in MariMar, Dyesebel, Amaya, Darna and Temptation of Wife.

As a recording artist, Rivera has released two albums: the compilation Marian Rivera Dance Hits and Retro Crazy (which contains her song "Sabay Sabay Tayo" plus dance medleys performed by Retro Crazy Gang). She has starred in films such as My Bestfriend's Girlfriend, You to Me Are Everything, and Panday 2.

She was included in 2011's Top 20 Endorsers. She was hailed as FHM Magazines Sexiest Woman in 2008, 2013, and 2014, setting the record of three cumulative victories through online voting and SMS. She was selected as one of the members of the selection committee at the Miss Universe 2021 pageant.

Early life and education
Marian Rivera Gracia was born in Madrid, Spain to Francisco Javier Gracia Alonso, a Spaniard, and Amalia Rivera, a Filipina from Cavite. Her parents married and eventually divorced when she was three years old, after which her mother brought her to the Philippines where she grew up. However, her mother had to leave to continue her work commitment abroad and Rivera was sent to her maternal grandmother, Francisca Rivera, in Maragondon, Cavite.

Rivera pursued her elementary and high school education at Saint Francis of Assisi College System, and obtained a Bachelor of Arts in Psychology degree from the De La Salle University-Dasmariñas. After graduation, she worked for a mental institution in Mandaluyong where she gave out medicine and conducted examinations and evaluations of patients.

Career

2004–2008: Career beginnings
Marian Rivera pursued ramp modelling in her elementary schooling years then later as TV commercial model for SkinWhite lotion, Sky Flakes biscuits, and other labels. These commercial appearances led TAPE Inc. executive producer Tony Tuviera commission her for roles in the afternoon TV soap operas Kung Mamahalin Mo Lang Ako, Agawin Mo Man ang Lahat, and Pinakamamahal. Rivera made her first supporting role film appearance through OctoArts' Enteng Kabisote 2: Okay Ka Fairy Ko: The Legend Continues in 2005 as the fairy Alyssa. In 2006, she signed a contract with Regal Entertainment that featured her debut in the horror film Pamahiin.

In February 2007, GMA Network cast her for motherly roles; first in the Filipino-Malaysian TV drama series Muli. and lastly in the fantasy TV series, Super Twins as the protagonist twins' mother, and villain on later episodes that concluded on 1 June 2007.

In June 2007, Rivera auditioned for and won the lead role in GMA Network's adaptation of the popular Mexican series MariMar (based on Televisa's the 1994 Mexican telenovela of the same title). Opposite to Dingdong Dantes, the show became the highest-rated prime time drama show on Philippine television at that time and launched Rivera to stardom.

She was acknowledged as a Phenomenal TV Star in the 38th Box-Office Entertainment Awards by the Guillermo Mendoza Memorial Scholarship Foundation, Inc. in 2008. That year she won an award for her work in the show, as well as several product endorsements. She was named the country's sexiest woman by FHM magazine, and was also included in the "hottest" list of other magazines like Maxim and Uno.

That same year, she appeared in two films, Desperadas and Bahay Kubo, both Metro Manila Film Festival entries.

In 2008, Rivera played the title role in Dyesebel, which aired on 28 April 2008, the famous Philippine mermaid character acted by many famous Filipinos actresses from as early as 1970. The series is another team-up with Dantes. The year marked Rivera's first lead role opposite Richard Gutierrez in My Best Friend's Girlfriend. In the same year, Dantes and Rivera debuted in One True Love, directed by Mac Alejandre. She also appeared in two Metro Manila Film Festival entries such as Shake, Rattle & Roll X, an omnibus horror trilogy in which she played "Nieves, The Engkanto Slayer", and Desperadas 2, a sequel of the 2007 film of the same with Rufa Mae Quinto, Iza Calzado, Ruffa Gutierrez, and Ogie Alcasid. She was among the third batch of stars honored in the Eastwood City Walk of Fame located in Eastwood City, Libis, Quezon City in 2008.

Rivera released her first dance music album entitled Marian Rivera Dance Hits under Universal Records in 2008. It was a compilation of 12 songs, danced and choreographed by Rivera. The album certified a 2-time Platinum Record Award by the Philippine Association of the Record Industry (or PARI).

2009–2014: Rise to fame
In 2009, she released her first single, "Sabay Sabay Tayo" under her second album Retro Crazy. The single and the album both received Gold Award and later on, a Platinun Record Award from PARI.

In February 2009, she appeared in Ang Babaeng Hinugot sa Aking Tadyang, an adaptation of Carlo J. Caparas' graphic novel. It was her third team-up with Dingdong Dantes. Later that year, she was paired with Dennis Trillo in an adaptation of the famous historical fiction heroine created by Mars Ravelo, Darna. She played Narda, who turns into superheroine Darna, after swallowing a magical stone. Nestor Torre of Philippine Daily Inquirer described the series as "loud and livid", praising Rivera's acting. Trillo and Rivera later teamed-up for the second time on the horror-suspense film Tarot produced by Regal Entertainment.

She appeared on her first sitcom, Show Me Da Manny, alongside Manny Pacquiao. According to Philippine Star, Rivera showed a natural comic skill.

Rivera, starred in the Philippine adaptation of Endless Love, a Korean series, aired on GMA Network. Rivera reunited with Dantes in You to Me Are Everything, a romantic-comedy film under GMA Films which premiered on 5 May 2010. She played Francisca Carantes, a girl from Cordillera who turns out to be the daughter of a millionaire.

Gracia starred in her own Metro Manila Film Festival entry, Super Inday and the Golden Bibe, for which she was nominated as Best Actress at the festival's awards night. She starred on a Holy Week drama special, Anghel sa Lupa (Earth Angel), produced by APT Entertainment, as well as in a Christmas series aired on GMA Network, The Christmas Doll.

In 2011, she was cast in Temptation Island, a remake of the 1980 film of the same name. She reprised the role of Cristina G., a beauty queen aspirant who has been trapped on an island together with contenders acted by Heart Evangelista, Solenn Heussaff, Lovi Poe, and Ruffa Mae Quinto. She also starred in Bong Revilla's film, Ang Panday 2. That same year, she headlined Amaya, a historical drama fiction depicting early Filipinos in the 16th century. She won several awards and accolades including "Favorite TV Actress" on 2011 KZONE Awards, "Best Actress" in a Prime Time Television Series on NSSUA Awards, and for the first time as "Best Actress" in Golden Screen TV Awards in 2013.

That same year, she won her second "Best Actress" award for the same show at the 2013 Northwest Samar State University Annual Awards. The series is promoted by the National Historical Commission of the Philippines and Department of Education due to its cultural concept that shows and depicts the Filipino material culture, beliefs, traditions and mores in the Pre-Hispanic era.

In 2012, Rivera headlined on different programs of GMA Network such as My Beloved, a Filipino romance drama-suspense-thriller series created and written by RJ Nuevas, under the helm of Dominic Zapata and Lore Reyes.

The series premiered on 13 February 2012, it follows the life and love story of an angel of death named Arlan, a fictional character portrayed by Dantes, who falls in love with a human named Sharina, played by Rivera. He was punished and sent to earth to become human being. But complications arise when he found himself trapped in the body of a notorious criminal. She was cast on her second sitcom Tweets for My Sweet, which earned her two nominations as "Best Actress in comedy show" on 2012 PMPC Star Awards and 2013 Golden Screen TV Awards.

Rivera hosted a reality show, Extra Challenge, with Richard Gutierrez and Boobay.  The show is a recurring reality show originally aired in 1999, 2003 and 2006.

In the latter part of 2012, Rivera gained another fame through the Philippine adaptation of a popular Korean series, Temptation of Wife, which aired on the same network. She played Angeline, a long-suffering wife, who has been lied to by  his husband, Marcel and a friend named Heidi. Angeline returned as "Chantal", a rich sophisticated woman who takes revenge on the people who had hurt her. The series once again gave fame to Rivera on various Asian countries, resulting to a fan meeting and television guesting's in Vietnam, where the series was aired, along with her other works. The series gave Rivera a "Best Actress" award at the PMPC Star Awards for TV and a "Best Actress in a Lead Role" nomination from the 18th Asian Television Awards with Lorna Tolentino in the series Pahiram Ng Sandali. She appeared on her second movie with Richard Gutierrez in a romantic-comedy film entitled My Lady Boss. According to her, "It’s my first time to play a mean but ultraconservative character...", referring on her role as Evelyn, "the boss from hell".

Rivera made an appearance for  Ekstra: The Bit Player, an official entry to the 2013 Cinemalaya Philippine Independent Film Festival. Rivera appeared with Ai-Ai delas Alas in Kung Fu Divas, a film distributed by Star Cinema as part of their 20th Anniversary in the Philippine Film Industry, Rivera also act as co-producer of the said film.

This prompted her to appear for the first time on ABS-CBN, rival network of GMA Network. She appeared on three consecutive episodes of Kris TV, a taped interview in Showbiz Inside Report, and a live interview on The Buzz with Delas Alas. Her last appearance on ABS-CBN was a live interview in Bandila. During the interviews, she revealed she had her on-the-job training (OJT) in ABS-CBN during her college days.

2014–present: Later years
https://aphrodite.gmanetwork.com/entertainment/articles/900_675_25__20190802122459.jpg
Rivera returned to prime time with a heavy-drama project temporarily entitled as Carmela (formerly "Catarina") broadcast by GMA Network on 27 January 2014, wherein she was occasionally paired with Alden Richards.

On 19 April 2014, she headlined in another Lenten television drama anthology special, Panalangin. It was the fourth time she had starred in a Lenten series which was also produced by APT Entertainment and broadcast in the same network.

In 2015, Rivera was supposed to appear in her comeback television program entitled The Rich Man's Daughter, but due to her pregnancy, she was then replaced by fellow Kapuso celebrity Rhian Ramos respectively. Despite of her first pregnancy, Rivera pursued to continue some of her appointments in which she appeared in different television commercial ads namely Biofit Tea, Hana Shampoo, Kopiko Cafe Blanca, 555 Tuna, and the recent Del Monte Quick & Easy TV ad, together with her husband Dingdong Dantes. Magazine covers that featured Rivera such as UNO Magazine, MEG Magazine, Preview Magazine, Speed Magazine, Weddings & Beyond Magazine are to be name the few. In the cover of UNO Magazine, Rivera was quoted as saying "Pregnancy is a beautiful thing", describing her present condition in her Instagram account.

Rivera was selected as USTv's Student Leaders Choice for Female Social Media Personality Gawad Sulo ng Bayan Natatanging Pilipinang Aktres sa Pelikula at Telebisyon on Golden Torch CCA, Inc., and the 2nd PEPList Choice Awards for its Newsmaker of the Year category, with Dingdong Dantes, was accepted by ABS-CBN newscaster Korina Sanchez on behalf of the couple. Rivera was included to Rogue Magazine's Top 50 Most Influential Filipino Online.

That same year, she headlined with Ai-Ai delas Alas, joined by Alden Richards, Julie Anne San Jose, as well as comedians  Jose Manalo and Wally Bayola in the comedy-variety show Sunday PinaSaya.
 In 2016, Rivera marked her comeback in television as part of the remake of GMA Network's fantasy TV show, Encantadia.

Rivera made her surprise cameo appearance in romantic-comedy film, Imagine You and Me which stars the love team of Alden Richards and Maine Mendoza.

In 2017, Rivera debuted in her drama anthology for Overseas Filipino Workers (OFW), Tadhana, which premiered 20 May. She appeared in Super Ma'am since September.
In 2021, Rivera was a member of the selection committee for Miss Universe 2021 held at Eilat, Israel.

Philanthropy
In 2009, Rivera and Dingdong Dantes, with assistance from Yes Pinoy Foundation, Philippine National Red Cross and Philippine Marines went to Cainta, Rizal to help the victim of Typhoon Ondoy. Aside from being a volunteer in GMA Network's telethon, she helped repacking relief goods from the GMA Kapuso Foundation, a charitable institution from the network.

In 2011, Rivera joined "Marriott Manila", in reaching out for victims of Typhoon Sendong particularly the children in Pasay.

In August 2012, Rivera joined the Philippine Red Cross team during their mission in Quezon City to help out the victims of the flooding. Rivera, together with former senator Dick Gordon, waded through floodwaters to get to an area where some 500 families sought refuge from the floods caused by the non-stop rains. She stated that helping out the victims is her 28th birthday gift to herself. She also said that she didn’t mind getting wet and tired during the mission, as she says it was a small sacrifice compared to the hardships that the victims are experiencing. According to Rivera, she went as a volunteer and not as a celebrity.

Rivera joined Kris Aquino in visiting affected areas throughout Metro Manila. Rivera organized a blood donation program for the Red Cross at the Ever Gotesco in Quezon City in celebration of her 28th birthday wherein it was attended by lot of people including celebrities.

In 2013, Rivera and her boyfriend Dingdong Dantes contributed for the fund-raising event at the annual Noel Bazaar, the long-running Christmas shopping event in Pasay for GMA Kapuso Foundation. During the Philippines' Typhoon Haiyan, the strongest typhoon ever recorded, Rivera also helped in the packing of relief goods to be distributed to the affected families and supported the Yes Pinoy Foundation's victim assistance program. In addition to that, she launched Oplan: Bangka, a livelihood project in which Rivera will shoulder the expenses for the construction of fishing boats that will be given for Cebu's fishermen.

In 2013, Rivera, along with Dingdong Dantes, joined PETA in their campaign to free the elephant Mali from the Manila Zoo.

On 31 March 2014, she lent her star power to promote the rights of women and children with disabilities in the country as she was appointed by the Congress of the Philippines as Ambassador for Women and Children with Disabilities. She proposed a public-private partnership for the establishment of a special school for children with disabilities so that they can have better access to education. On the latter part of the year, Rivera adds another advocacy to her list as she actively supports "Smile Train", an international children’s charity with a sustainable approach to a single, solvable problem: cleft lip and palate.

Public image

Rivera was declared as [[FHM|FHM Magazine'''s]] Sexiest Woman in 2008. With her victory, the FHM staff clarified that contrary to popular impression, Rivera was already being eyed by FHM even before her career skyrocketed because of Marimar. Before arising as top 1 in the Top 100 list, she was already listed in the list in 2006 and 2007 at #38 and #24 respectively.

She was consistently in the upper top 10 after her declaration as Philippines' finest woman, ranking #3 in 2009, #4 in 2010 and #2 losing to Sam Pinto, in 2011.

In 2009, Rivera was listed at #5 in the "Top 20 Celebrity Endorser"'s list of Manila Standard and #1 in QTV's Ang Pinaka... List of Endorsers. In 2010, she was listed at SPOT's list of "Top 10 Most In-demand Celebrity Endorsers" at #3. Christine Marie Leido of AB Communications, Inc. stated, "In our choice, for instance, of Marian Rivera[...]she provided the excitement, fresh look and instant recognition the brand needed. The market understood the product and was able to relate to it because she embodied the values the brand stood for ... As could be expected, she motivated purchase because of her appeal across all classes and gender."

In 2011, YES! Magazine listed her on their "Top 20 Endorsers" list which was a result of cumulative earnings of each celebrity on their endorsements alone.

In 2012, she charted at #9 on the "Top 10 International Beauties of 2012" published by TopTenz, the only Asian who made it to the list. According to the website, Rivera belonged to the major stars of the Philippines.

Also in 2012, Rivera entered at #5 in FHMs Sexiest Women list, her lowest since topping the list in 2008. She featured on the cover for the first time on FHM through its January 2013 issue, which made her one of the biggest contenders for the title Sexiest Woman of the World for 2013. Rivera appeared on the cover of Cosmopolitan Magazine in the same month. For the third time, she was featured on the cover of Women's Health in March 2013. She stated she owed her physique to Muay Thai and Wushu; both forms of martial arts.

In 2013, Rivera was declared by FHM Philippines as "the sexiest woman in the Philippines", making her second to reclaim the coveted title five years after she first won it (the first was Angel Locsin, who won it in '05 and '10). According to FHM'', more than 16 million votes were cast that year, and the final tally saw Rivera raking in a total of 890,490 votes against Sam Pinto's 778,681.

Also in 2013, Rivera became the image of popular brand Ginebra San Miguel following her successful stint for the brand back in 2009.

Personal life

In August 2014, during a live airing of Rivera's dance program, Dantes, her longtime boyfriend, made a special guest appearance. Dantes made a surprise live proposal to Rivera. It was the second proposal by Dantes; the first one was in Macau. In order to marry him, she had to be received into the Roman Catholic Church via conditional baptism as her baptism in Spain was not recognized as valid since the church that administered it was not on the list of recognized valid baptisms by the Roman Catholic Church in the Philippines at the time. Prior to her rebaptism in the Roman Catholic Church, Rivera was a practicing Aglipayan of the Philippine Independent Church.

On 30 December 2014, she married Dingdong Dantes. The wedding was held at Cubao Cathedral in Quezon City, while the reception took place at the Mall of Asia Arena in Pasay, and was televised on GMA Network. Dantes and Rivera had invited over 1,200 guests to their wedding. In April 2015, the couple announced that they were expecting their first child. Rivera gave birth to a daughter, Maria Letizia (named Zia), at the Makati Medical Center on 23 November 2015.

Rivera supports breastfeeding in public. She was given the Breastfeeding Influencer and Advocate Award by the Mother and Child Nurses Association of the Philippines on 25 November 2016, citing her advocacy for public breastfeeding.

On 25 September 2018, Dantes and Rivera announced that they were expecting their second child. Their son, Jose Sixto Gonzalez (named Ziggy), was born at the Makati Medical Center on 16 April 2019.

Filmography

Film

Television series

Television shows

Hosting

Discography

Albums

Singles

Awards and recognition

References

External links

 Marian Rivera on GMANetwork.com
 

1984 births
Living people
Actresses from Madrid
Converts to Roman Catholicism from Catholic Independent denominations
Filipino film actresses
Filipino television actresses
Filipino female models
Filipino people of Spanish descent
Filipino Roman Catholics
Tagalog people
People from Bacoor
Actresses from Cavite
Filipina gravure idols
GMA Network personalities
Filipino television talk show hosts
21st-century Filipino actresses
21st-century Filipino women singers